HMS Gipsy (or Gipsey) has been the name of several Royal Navy ships:

 , a schooner in service from 1799 to 1804 that captured several French privateers.
 , a schooner purchased in Jamaica in 1804 and sold in 1808.
 Gipsy, a schooner tender launched in 1836 and sold in 1892.
 , a  destroyer launched in 1897 and sold in 1921. The hull was used as a pontoon until at least 1937.
 , a G-class destroyer launched in 1935 and mined on 21 November 1939 off Harwich.
 Gypsy, the former Gravesend ferry Carlotta, requisitioned as a depot ship for the auxiliary patrol service. Bombed at Tower Pier, London in 1941

References
 

Royal Navy ship names